Erik Winfree (born September 26, 1969) is an American applied computer scientist, bioengineer, and professor at California Institute of Technology.  He is a leading researcher into DNA computing and DNA nanotechnology.

In 1998, Winfree in collaboration with Nadrian Seeman published the creation of two-dimensional lattices of DNA tiles using the "double crossover" motif. These tile-based structures provided the capability to implement DNA computing, which was demonstrated by Winfree and Paul Rothemund in 2004, and for which they shared the 2006 Feynman Prize in Nanotechnology.

In 1999, he was named to the MIT Technology Review TR100 as one of the top 100 innovators in the world under the age of 35.

He graduated from the University of Chicago with a BS, and from the Computation and Neural Systems program at the California Institute of Technology with a PhD, where he studied with John Hopfield and Al Barr.
He was a Lewis Thomas Postdoctoral Fellow in Molecular Biology at Princeton University.  He was a 2000 MacArthur Fellow. His father Arthur Winfree, a theoretical biologist, was also a MacArthur Fellow.

Works
DNA Based Computers V: Dimacs Workshop DNA Based Computers V June 14–15, 1999 Massachusetts Institute of Technology, Editors Erik Winfree, David K. Gifford, AMS Bookstore, 2000, 
Evolution as computation: DIMACS workshop, Princeton, January 1999, Editors Laura Faye Landweber, Erik Winfree, Springer, 2002, 
"DNA Computing by Self-Assembly", Ninth Annual Symposium on Frontiers of Engineering, National Academies Press, 2004, 
Algorithmic Bioprocesses, Editors Anne Condon, David Harel, Joost N. Kok, Arto Salomaa, Erik Winfree, Springer, 2009,

References

External links

"Erik Winfree", Scientific Commons
AAAS Member Spotlight: Erik Winfree studies the computational components of DNA

Living people
California Institute of Technology faculty
California Institute of Technology alumni
University of Chicago alumni
Princeton University fellows
MacArthur Fellows
American computer scientists
American bioengineers
DNA nanotechnology people
1969 births